Adib Astronomy Teaching Centre in Isfahan, Iran from Municipality of Isfahan's sport and culture organization started in 1994 with the purpose of recreation and learning. It has a specialized library, a 3D film cinema, an exhibition and observation tools.

References 

Amateur astronomy
Astronomy in Iran